The Hunt for Death is a 1920 German silent film directed by Karl Gerhardt and starring Lil Dagover. It was followed by three sequels.

The film's art direction was by Hermann Warm.

Cast
In alphabetical order

References

Bibliography

External links

1920 films
1920 adventure films
German adventure films
Films of the Weimar Republic
Films directed by Karl Gerhardt
German silent feature films
Films set in India
Films set in China
Films produced by Erich Pommer
German black-and-white films
Silent adventure films
1920s German films
1920s German-language films